Jensen may refer to:

People and fictional characters
 Jensen (surname), a list of people and fictional characters
 Jensen (given name), a list of people
 Jensen (gamer), Danish professional League of Legends player

Places
 Jensen, Queensland, Australia, a suburb of Townsville
 Jensen, Utah, United States, a census-designated place

Business
 Jensen Electronics, an electronics brand owned by Audiovox Corporation
 Jensen Loudspeakers
 Jensen-Group, an international company that manufactures machines for the heavy-duty laundry industry
 Jensen Group, an investment company dealing with Russian real estate
 Jensen Motors, a defunct British manufacturer of sports cars and commercial vehicles
 Jensen Steam Engines, a maker of model/toy steam engines

Other uses
 Jensen Prize, for the best papers in the Journal of Financial Economics
 Jensen!, a late-night Dutch television show
 Jensen Oval, Sydney, Australia, a soccer park
 Jensen MotorSport, an auto racing team that competes in the Firestone Indy Lights series
 Jensen, development codename for the DECpc AXP 150 computer
 5900 Jensen, an asteroid

See also
 East Jensen Island, Greenland
 West Jensen Island, Greenland
 Jansen (disambiguation)
 Jenson (disambiguation)